On 1 May 2021, a fire in a hospital in Bharuch, Gujarat, India, killed at least 16 COVID-19 patients and 2 nurses.

Background 
India is badly affected by the COVID-19 pandemic and facing a second wave of the pandemic. On 23 April 2021, 13 COVID-19 patients in a hospital in Virar, Maharashtra, died after a fire broke out at the intensive care unit (ICU) of the hospital.

Incident 
In the early hours of 1 May 2021, at 1 AM, a fire broke out in the COVID-19 ward of Bharuch Welfare Hospital, a COVID-19 designated hospital, located around 190 km from Ahmedabad, Gujarat.

Aftermath 
The Prime Minister of India, Narendra Modi expressed his deep condolences by saying,  Pained by the loss of lives due to a fire at a hospital in Bharuch.

See also 
 2021 Baghdad hospital fire
 Gaziantep hospital fire
 Matei Balș hospital fire
 Piatra Neamț hospital fire
 Virar hospital fire

References

2021 disasters in India
2021 fires in Asia
2020s in Gujarat
May 2021 events in India
COVID-19 pandemic in India
Disasters in Gujarat
Hospital fires in Asia
Hospital fire